Carlisle railway station is a railway station on the Transperth network. It is located on the Thornlie Line, 7.4 kilometres from Perth station serving the suburbs of Carlisle and East Victoria Park.

History
Carlisle station opened in 1893 as Haydon's Siding, being renamed Mint Street in 1912, East Victoria Park in 1912 and finally Carlisle in 1919.

As part of the New MetroRail project, the station was upgraded between February 2003 and January 2005.

Future
As part of a Metronet project for several level crossing removals on the Armadale line, Carlisle railway station will be rebuilt as an elevated station, enabling the replacement of the Mint Street level crossing with a rail-over-road bridge. The new station is proposed to be built closer to Mint Street, and west of the current railway alignment, allowing train services to continue during construction. The new station will initially be accessed via stairs and elevators, and its design will allow escalators and fare gates to be added in the future. Parking will be underneath the railway.  The new station platforms will be side platforms, as opposed to the current island platforms. This is to reduce the impact of the bridge structure on the surrounding area. The platforms will also be built to the length of a six-car train, as opposed to the current station which only has a length of a four-car train.

Services
Carlisle station is served by Transperth Armadale/Thornlie line services.

The station saw 167,460 passengers in the 2013-14 financial year.

Platforms

Bus routes

References

External links
 Gallery History of Western Australian Railways & Stations
 

Armadale and Thornlie lines
Railway stations in Perth, Western Australia
Railway stations in Australia opened in 1893